Hypotia muscosalis is a species of snout moth in the genus Hypotia. It was described by Rebel in 1917, and is known from Spain and the Canary Islands.

The wingspan is 11.5–13.5 mm. The forewings are greyish white. The hindwings are white, sprinkled with light brown scales, the colour is a little darker towards the termen and at the apex.

References

Moths described in 1917
Hypotiini